Przewodów is a village in the administrative district of Gmina Dołhobyczów, within Hrubieszów County, Lublin Voivodeship, in southeastern Poland, close to the border with Ukraine. The village is located in the historical region of Galicia.

As of 2021, the village had a population of 413.

History

Missile strike

On the evening of 15 November 2022, the village was hit by a stray missile (likely of Ukrainian origin) as a result of the ongoing war in Ukraine, killing two people (Bogusław Wos and Bogdan Ciupek).

References

External links

Villages in Hrubieszów County